James Fairlie Cooper (September 2, 1814 – October 14, 1869) was an American minter and soldier.

Biography
Cooper was born in New York City on October 2, 1814. He was an alumnus of the United States Military Academy at West Point; graduating in 1834 as 17th out of 36. Commissioned into the United States Army he served in the 3rd U.S. Infantry as a second lieutenant; doing topographical surveys and being stationed in Louisiana. Cooper resigned his commission in 1837.

By 1843, he had become the (third) superintendent of the Dahlonega Mint in Georgia and remained in the position until 1849. Forty-four percent of the mint's coinage was struck during his tenure.

When the American Civil war started in 1861, he briefly served in the Confederate States Army from May to December as lieutenant colonel of the 7th Georgia Infantry Regiment.

Afterwards, he became a civil engineer and surveyor. He died in Atlanta, Georgia, on October 14, 1869, and was buried there on Oakland Cemetery.

References

External links

United States Military Academy alumni
Mints of the United States
Confederate States Army officers
1814 births
1869 deaths
Burials at Oakland Cemetery (Atlanta)